Visions was an annual science fiction convention held from 1990 to 1998 in Rosemont, Illinois on Thanksgiving weekend. The convention was held at the Hyatt Regency O'Hare except for the 1992 event which was held at the Ramada O'Hare.  The convention was originally called Visions but was renamed HME Visions in 1998.  It was also known as "A British TV Celebration" before its first event.

The convention was founded by retired fireman, electrical contractor, and long-time Doctor Who fan Robert H. McLaughlin III of Hoffman Estates, Illinois.  He organized the 1990 Doctor Who convention to raise money for Lambs Farm.  The convention was run by McLaughlin with a committee of about twenty plus fan volunteers (gophers) recruited at each event.

Over time the convention expanded from a Doctor Who convention into a celebration of British TV shows.  While the main focus of each convention was Doctor Who, Visions often invited actors from Blake's 7, Red Dwarf and Robin of Sherwood.  Visions '93 celebrated the 30th anniversary of Doctor Who and the 15th anniversary of Blake's 7.

Convention events

Panels
The main attraction of each convention was the hour-long question and answer sessions with the celebrities.  There were also smaller gatherings run by fans called fan panels.

Variety show
The cabaret (renamed "variety show" in 1992) was 90-120 minute show featuring celebrity guests performing a variety of acts. A separate admission fee was charged for this event.

Dealers' room

Video rooms
Video rooms (one in 1990, two thereafter) ran television shows and movies, concentrating on programs that attending celebrities appeared in. A third room featuring fan-made videos was added in 1996.

Autographs and photographs
Each fan was given the opportunity to meet the celebrities and receive and autograph and a photograph.

Costume contest/masquerade ball

Art show

Auction
Each year fans participated in an auction of science fiction memorabilia. Proceeds went to Lambs Farm and the Make-A-Wish Foundation.

Gaming

Publications

Program book
A program book was given to each attending fan. The book included biographies of the guests, a map of the hotel, a schedule of the weekend's events and general convention rules.

Newsletter
ReVisions was published 4-6 times a year and contained news about the past and/or upcoming convention.

Rookie guide
The Visions Rookie Guide was written for first-time attendees of Visions.

Websites
The original website was at http://www.xnet.com/~tardis.  A second, http://hme-visions.com, was added in northern autumn 1998.

Merchandise

T-shirts
T-shirts featuring that year's logo were available for purchase by mail or at the convention.

Videos
Video tapes of selected panels and variety shows were available for purchase by mail.

Special events

 Attendees of Visions '92 were given the chance to help in the development of the Doctor Who pinball machine. At least one machine was available for play during the convention.
 To celebrate the 30th anniversary of Doctor Who the BBC broadcast a specially-made episode called Dimensions in Time. Producer John Nathan-Turner brought a copy to Visions '93 and showed it Friday and Saturday nights.  As the episode was made in 3-D, special glasses were sold for the viewings with the proceeds going to Children in Need.
 The 1996 convention saw the premiere performance of Mysterious Theatre 337 (MT337). An homage to Mystery Science Theater 3000, MT337 performed to Doctor Who episodes instead of B movies. Additional performances occurred in 1997 and 1998 and continue at Chicago TARDIS and Gallifrey One.

Other conventions
Visions followed earlier conventions held in the Chicago area around Thanksgiving. Brit TV was held in 1988 (in Lincolnwood, Illinois) and 1989 (in Rosemont, Illinois).  Spirit of Light Enterprises ran Doctor Who conventions in the mid-1980s.  Following the demise of Visions Chicago TARDIS took over the Thanksgiving slot beginning in 2000.

Notes and references

External links
Mysterious Theatre 337
Chicago TARDIS
Gallifrey One

Defunct science fiction conventions in the United States
Conventions in Illinois
Recurring events established in 1990
Recurring events disestablished in 1998
Doctor Who fandom
1990 establishments in Illinois
1998 disestablishments in Illinois